The DB Class V 65 locomotives (from 1968: Class 265) were German, eight-wheeled, rod-coupled diesel locomotives operated by Deutsche Bundesbahn (DB) intended for light railway services and medium-heavy shunting duties. The 15 locomotives were delivered in 1956 by MaK (Kiel) to the DB.

Description
Class V 65/Class 265 engines were delivered to the DB shortly after the arrival in service of the first V 60s. Amongst their special features were the MaK motor with only 750 rpm and the Beugniot lever between the individual axles, that improved curve running. For train heating the engine had a boiler that was heated by the engine's exhaust gases. The engine itself had to be pre-heated with a Dofa coke oven. For this purpose up to 100 kg of coke could be carried.

Although, with only 15 units, the Class V 65 was built in relatively small numbers, it was really only a slight modification of the 600 D built by MaK for private railways. These belonged to the so-called MaK rod-coupled locomotives (MaK-Stangenlokomotiven), that were operated in large numbers by private railways.

Operations
The locomotives were initially deployed in the area of Marburg/Lahn ahead of light passenger trains, but in 1964 they were replaced by the more powerful V 100. After that, five examples were used for shunting duties at Puttgarden ferryboat station until 1980, being stationed at the depot (Bahnbetriebswerk) at Puttgarden. The remainder were employed at Hamburg-Altona where their duties included working on the Hamburg Harbour railway.

Locomotive V 65 001 has been preserved and, after a term with the Meppen-Haselünne Railway is now looked after by the Osnabrück Steam Railway Society (Osnabrücker Dampflokfreunden) and is used as a museum railway engine. Another V65, number V 65 011, has been loaned by the DB Museum to the Bochum-Dahlhausen Railway Museum owned by the DGEG.

Appearance in film 
In the first scenes of the 1962 film Die Tür mit den sieben Schlössern (The Door with the Seven Locks) a DB V 65 engine can clearly be seen standing in the station. This reveals that the scenes were filmed in a German station and not - as the film tries to suggest by the use of various English signs - at a station in London.

See also 
 List of DB locomotives and railbuses

External links 
 V65 bei www.loks-aus-kiel.de

V 065
D locomotives
MaK locomotives
Railway locomotives introduced in 1956
Standard gauge locomotives of Germany
Shunting locomotives